Datuk Siringan bin Gubat (28 November 1949 – 20 March 2018) was a Malaysian politician. He is the Minister for Resource Development and Information Technology in the state government of Sabah, and represents the seat of Paginatan in the Sabah State Legislative Assembly. From 2008 to 2013 he was the Member of the Parliament of Malaysia for the Ranau constituency. He is a member of the United Pasokmomogun Kadazandusun Murut Organisation (UPKO) party in the Barisan Nasional (BN) coalition.

Siringan was a member of the State Assembly between 1990 and 2004. He was first elected as a member of the United Sabah Party (PBS), but defected with Bernard Dompok in 1994 to join the Barisan Nasional coalition with a newly formed party that became UPKO.

He was elected to the federal Parliament in the 2008 election after the incumbent member, UPKO's President Bernard Dompok, shifted to the seat of Penampang. He served one term, before returning to the State Assembly at the 2013 Malaysian general election. After the election he was appointed as the Sabah Minister for Resource Development and Information Technology.

He died on 20 March 2018 at the age of 68. His remains are buried at Kampung Kinarasan, Ranau.

Election results

Honours

Honours of Malaysia
  :
 Officer of the Order of the Defender of the Realm (KMN) - (2002)
  Companion of the Order of Loyalty to the Crown of Malaysia (JSM) (2007)
  Commander of the Order of Meritorious Service (PJN) - Datuk (2017)
  :
  Commander of the Order of Kinabalu (PGDK) - Datuk (1998)

References 

1949 births
2018 deaths
People from Sabah
Members of the Dewan Rakyat
Kadazan-Dusun people
Malaysian Anglicans
Members of the Sabah State Legislative Assembly
Sabah state ministers
United Progressive Kinabalu Organisation politicians
United Sabah Party politicians